Camille Petit is a Reader in Materials Engineering at Imperial College London. She designs and characterises functional materials for environmental sustainability.

Early life and education 
Petit completed her MSc in chemistry at the École nationale supérieure de chimie de Montpellier in 2007. She earned her PhD at City University of New York in 2011, working with Teresa Bandosz. She was awarded the Springer Nature thesis award in 2012, for her dissertation Factors Affecting the Removal of Ammonia from Air on Carbonaceous Materials.

Research and career 
Petit completed postdoctoral research in Alissa Park's group at Columbia University. She worked on carbon capture using nanoparticle organic hybrid materials (NOHMs). She synthesises them by ionic grafting polymer chains onto polyhedral oligomeric silsesquioxane (POSS). She developed several characterisation techniques to analyse their suitability for carbon capture, including nuclear magnetic resonance, Attenuated total reflectance Fourier-transform infrared spectroscopy and differential scanning calorimetry. In 2011 she was awarded the French Carbon Group award. In 2013 Petit joined the Department of Chemical Engineering at Imperial College London. She leads the Multifunctional Materials Laboratory. Here she develops nano-colloids, graphene-based materials, nitride and metal-organic frameworks. She has delivered several public lectures.

Petit is Associate Editor of the journal Frontiers in Energy - Carbon Capture, Storage, and Utilization. In 2019 she was awarded a prestigious European Research Council grant to develop a new class of photocatalysts to help convert carbon dioxide into fuel using sunlight.

Honours and awards 
2007 - American Carbon Society Mrozowski Award
2015 - Institution of Chemical Engineers Sir Frederick Warner medal
2017 - Institute of Materials, Minerals and Mining Silver Medal
2017 - American Institute of Chemical Engineers 35 under 35
2019 - Philip Leverhulme Prize 2019

References 

French women chemists
21st-century French chemists
Academics of Imperial College London
City University of New York alumni
Columbia University fellows
Living people
Year of birth missing (living people)
21st-century French women scientists